Mo Jiancheng (born March 1956) is a former Chinese politician who spent most of his career in both Inner Mongolia and Jiangxi. As of August 2017 he was under investigation by the Communist Party's anti-corruption agency. Previously he served as leader of the discipline inspection team sent by Central Commission for Discipline Inspection (CCDI) to Ministry of Finance (MOF) from December 2015 to August 2017, Deputy Communist Party Secretary of Jiangxi from January 2015 to December 2015, executive vice-governor of Jiangxi from July 2013 to September 2015, Communist Party Secretary of Baotou from November 2006 to April 2010, and Communist Party Secretary of Tongliao from January 2003 to December 2004. Mo worked with Su Rong for a long time.

Mo was a delegate to the 17th National Congress of the Chinese Communist Party and an alternate member of the 18th CCP Central Committee.

Biography
Mo was born in March 1956 in Shengzhou, Zhejiang. He graduated from the Central Party School of the Chinese Communist Party and Inner Mongolia Agricultural University.

Inner Mongolia Autonomous Region
During the Down to the Countryside Movement, he was a sent-down youth in Wuhai, Inner Mongolia. He entered the workforce in February 1972, and joined the Chinese Communist Party in May 1977. In October 1993 he was promoted to become vice-mayor of Wuhai, a position he held until February 1998. From February 1998 to February 2000 he briefly served as deputy director of Inner Mongolia Autonomous Region Township Enterprise Bureau. He became the Mayor of Tongliao, a prefecture-level city under the jurisdiction of Inner Mongolia, in September 2001, and then Communist Party Secretary, the top political position in the city, beginning in January 2003. In December 2004, he was appointed director of CCP Inner Mongolia Autonomous Region Publicity Department, he remained in that position until November 2006, when he was transferred to Baotou and appointed Communist Party Secretary.

Jiangxi
In April 2010 he was transferred to Nanchang, capital of central China's Jiangxi province, and appointed director of CCP Jiangxi Provincial Organization Department. He rose to become executive vice-governor in July 2013, in January 2015 he was promoted again to become Deputy Communist Party Secretary. At the end of that same year, he was transferred to Beijing, capital of Chian, where he served as a member of the Chinese Communist Party (CCP) committee of the Ministry of Finance (MOF) and leader of the discipline inspection team sent by Central Commission for Discipline Inspection (CCDI) to Ministry of Finance (MOF).

Downfall
On August 27, 2017, Mo Jiancheng has been placed under investigation for serious violations of laws and regulations by the party's disciplinary body. In November he was removed from membership of the 12th National People's Congress. On September 23, he was expelled from the Chinese Communist Party and removed from public office.

On September 12, 2018, the First Intermediate People's Court of Beijing tried to hear his case, the statement said that "Mo, suspected of taking bribes, took advantage of his posts to seek profits for others and accepted a huge amount of property".

On January 23, 2019, Mo was sentenced on 14 years in prison and fined four million yuan for taking bribes worth 42.59 million yuan.

References

1956 births
Central Party School of the Chinese Communist Party alumni
Living people
People's Republic of China politicians from Zhejiang
Chinese Communist Party politicians from Zhejiang
Alternate members of the 18th Central Committee of the Chinese Communist Party